The Anna L. Nickel telescope is a 1-meter reflecting telescope located at Lick Observatory in the U.S. state of  California.

The smaller dome on the main building at Lick had originally held the secondhand 12-inch Clark refracting telescope, the first telescope to be used at Lick.  In 1979 it was replaced with the Anna L. Nickel telescope, a 1-meter reflecting telescope.  The telescope is named for Anna L. Nickel, a San Francisco native who donated $50,000, a large portion of her estate, to the Observatory. 

The Nickel telescope was built entirely by UC Santa Cruz personnel and utilized many spare parts, including a replacement mirror for the Crossley Reflector. It eased demand for time on the 120-inch C. Donald Shane telescope by taking on research programs that do not require the Shane's greater light-gathering power. Due to its optical design, it can use the same instruments as the Shane so instruments can be tested on it.

See also
List of largest optical telescopes in the 20th century
List of astronomical observatories

Optical telescopes
Lick Observatory